Anakriya was a  cargo ship that was built in 1925 as Riga by Travewerk Gebrüder Goedhart AG, Hamburg, Germany. After a sale in 1934 she was renamed Königsberg. In 1939, she was renamed Stettin. In 1945, she was seized by the Allies at Hamburg, passed to the Ministry of War Transport (MoWT) and was renamed Empire Conway. In 1946, she was passed to the Soviet Union, initially renamed Stettin, and then renamed Anakriya.

Description
The ship was built in 1925 by Travewerk Gebrüder Goedhart AG, Lübeck. She was launched on 1 September 1925, and entered service on 4 November.

The engine was built by Görlitzer Maschinenfabrik, Görlitz.

History
Riga was built for Lübeck Linie AG, Lübeck. She was allocated the Code Letters PCDM. In 1934, Riga was sold to Matthies Reederei, Hamburg and was renamed Königsberg. She was renamed Stettin in 1939. On 4 September 1940. Stettin entered service as a hospital ship, with beds for 70 patients. She was employed in this rôle until 14 December. Between 7 August 1941 and 23 January 1943 she was used as a transport ship.

In May 1945, Stettin was seized by the Allies at Hamburg. She departed Hamburg for the United Kingdom on 9 July 1945. She was passed to the MoWT and renamed Empire Conway. She was placed under the management of R S Dalgleish Ltd, Newcastle upon Tyne. Her port of registry was changed to London. The Code Letters GKTM were allocated. The United Kingdom Official Number 180787 was allocated.

In 1946, Empire Conway was allocated to the Soviet Union. She was renamed Stettin. She was later renamed Anakriya. Anakriya was removed from shipping registers in 1960, and was scrapped in 1978.

References

1925 ships
Ships built in Hamburg
Steamships of Germany
Merchant ships of Germany
World War II merchant ships of Germany
Hospital ships in World War II
Ministry of War Transport ships
Empire ships
Steamships of the United Kingdom
Merchant ships of the United Kingdom
Steamships of the Soviet Union
Merchant ships of the Soviet Union
Maritime incidents in January 1941